Erik La Prade is an American freelance journalist, poet, photographer, and non-fiction writer. La Prade has had 14 publications. He is based in New York City.

About 
Erik La Prade was born in New York City. He received his B.A.degree in English in 1978 and M.A. degree in Comparative Literature in 1990 from City College of New York.

His poems have appeared in Hot Summer Nights: A Collection of Erotic Poetry and Prose (Inner Child Press, 2012), Wildflowers, a Woodstock mountain poetry anthology (Woodstock, NY: Shivistan Publishing), Artist and Influence, Fish Drum, The Hat, The Reading Room, The Sienese Shredder and The New York Times.  He has also served as Poetry Editor for The Reading Room.

La Prade's poem, "Baudelaire, Ashbery, Updike," earned Things Maps Don’t Show (Del Mar, CA: Aegis Press, 1995, pp. 43–44) a place in the Ashbery Research Center (ARC) archive of Bard College. ARC's copy of the book is shelved with a copy of correspondence from La Prade.

A collection of La Prade's interviews, Breaking Through: Richard Bellamy and The Green Gallery, 1960–1965, was published in 2010 by MidMarch Arts Press. The book traces the history of Bellamy's celebrated art gallery through interviews with twenty-three of its exhibited artists including Claes Oldenburg, James Rosenquist, and Frank Stella. A frequently cited source of information on the gallery, the book is archived at both the library of the Museum of Modern Art and at The Metropolitan Museum of Art, Thomas J. Watson Library. La Prade has also published articles and interviews in Art Critical, Art in America,  The Brooklyn Rail, NY Arts Magazine,  Rain Taxi: A Review of Books, Night Magazine, Captured: A  Film/Video History of The Lower East Side (Seven Story Press, 2005), and The Outlaw Bible of American Essays (Thunder's Mouth Press, 2006).

La Prade not only frequently writes about art and artists, he occasionally makes art. His photo, "A High Line Experience," appears in Lid Magazine #8 archived at the School of Visual Arts Library Picture & Periodicals Collections. Front Window Gallery has featured a collection of La Prade's black-and-white photographs, including candid portraits of Chuck Close, John Baldessari, among others.

La Prade is one of the subjects in a series of portrait photographs by Lucas Samaras, which includes Cindy Sherman and Lisa Yuskavage, among others, titled Poses / Born Actors, housed in the collection of the National Gallery of Art in Washington DC.

Bibliography 
 A Plague Year, Olympia, WA: Last Word Press, 2021 
 Weather & Other Poems, Olympia, WA: Last Word Press, 2020 
 Fourteen Minutes: Selected Poems, By Tomasz Marek Sobieraj, Translated by Erik La Prade, Oyster Bay, New York:  Cross-Cultural Communications, 2018 
 Neglected Powers, Olympia, WA: Last Word Press, 2017 
 Movie Logic, Hoboken, NJ: Poets Wear Prada, 2013 
 False Confessions, Palo Alto, CA: Alternating Current (Propaganda Press), 2011
 BREAKING THROUGH: Richard Bellamy and The Green Gallery, 1960–1965: Twenty-three Interviews, New York: MidMarch Arts Press, 2010 
 SWATCHES, Hoboken, NJ: Poets Wear Prada, 2008 
 Figure Studies: Poems, New York: Linear Arts Books, 2000 
 Things Maps Don’t Show, Del Mar, CA: Aegis Press, 1995

References

External links 

 New York Times, HOME & GARDEN, Metropolitan Diary by Ron Alexander, May 30, 1990, Page C00001: Dear Diary entry about La Prade's relationship with nighttime radio.
 BREAKING THROUGH: Richard Bellamy and The Green Gallery, 1960–1965: Twenty-three Interviews edited by Erik La Prade (New York: MidMarch Arts Press, 2010) 
 Book Review of Breaking Through: "Art Books in Review" by Greg Lindquist, The Brooklyn Rail, Art Seen, Nov. 2010
  Book Review of Neglected Powers: "Sophisticated Visions" by Ilka Scobie, American Book Review, Volume 39, Number 4, May/June 2018, pp. 18-19
 Book Review of Movie Magic, By Mark Mccawley/, Urban Graffiti, Posted on June 8, 2015
 "J Journal, New Writing on Justice, Volume 5 Number 2, Fall 2012, Biannual" Review by John Palen, New Pages, Literary Magazine Reviews, April 15, 2013:  Praise for La Prade's contribution
 WorldCat: Most widely held works by Eric La Prade
 Poetry Thin Air Interview - Scopino / La Prade - YouTube 
 Recording of Anne Cammon Fiero's WKCR (89.9 FM NY) radio show Art Waves featuring Erik La Prade
 "METROPOLITAN DIARY by Georgia Dullea (The New York Times); Living Desk, May 2, 1984, Wednesday, Late City Final Edition, Section C, Page 2, Column 1, 967 words: La Prade, proofreader for  New York City Law Department at 100 Church Street 
 "If the World's a Stage, A Theater Can Be Home" by Ron Alexander (The New York Times); Style, May 6, 1990: La Prade, editorial assistant at the Metropolitan Museum of Art, talks about attending home-cabaret evenings.
 "An Underground Scene Celebrates Aboveground" Knickerbocker by Gary Shapiro, The New York Sun, August 25, 2005. La Prade, poet and contributor, at launch of "Captured: A Film/Video History of the Lower East Side" (Seven Stories) at the Clayton Gallery. 
 NY Daily News, Showbiz, "Perfect 10: This week's news & to-do's," Monday, July 9, 2007, 4:00 AM: La Prade at READING RAINBOW: The Housing Works Bookstore Café on Wed. June 11, 2007
 Erik La Prade at Day 5 of Martha Rosler's Meta-Monumental Garage Sale November 17–30, 2012, Photo by Franco Frassetti (MoMA),  November 23, 2012 using a Canon EOS 40D.
Artists Knox Martin (L) and Eric La Prade attend the Ron Gorchov Opening at Nicholas Robinson Gallery on October 23, 2008 in New York City. (Photographer: Will Ragozzino/Getty Images North America)
La Prade with art curator and model Mie Iwatsuki at private preview in celebration of Fred Wilson at The Pace Gallery on March 16 2012 in New York City (Photographer: Will Ragozzino/BFA.com)
 New York Times, ON LANGUAGE; The Woid on-Oid, By William Safire, February 5, 1984, Section 6, Page 12: Regarding the first use of "diet-drink"

American essayists
Living people
American male poets
American male essayists
Year of birth missing (living people)
City College of New York alumni